The Louisiana Tech University Arboretum (50 acres, 20 hectares) is located on the South Campus of the Louisiana Tech University in Ruston, Louisiana. It is used by the university's School of Forestry as a research facility.

See also
List of botanical gardens in the United States

Arboreta in Louisiana
Botanical gardens in Louisiana
Louisiana Tech University
Protected areas of Lincoln Parish, Louisiana
Ruston, Louisiana